Mark Alan Hershkovitz is an American biochemist and taxonomist. 

In 1981 he received his Bachelor of Science from Illinois State University. He received his Master of Science and PhD degrees from University of California, Davis, in 1986 and 1990; his focus in his doctoral program was botany. Afterwards, he worked for the Laboratory of Molecular Systematics at the Smithsonian Institution as a postdoctoral scientist, and  he joined the National Center for Biotechnology Information as a fellow under the Postdoctoral Intramural Research Training Award.

 he is a professor at the University of Chile.

Taxa (re)named by Hershkovitz
Cistanthe amaranthoides (Phil.) Carolin ex Hershk.
C. arenaria (Cham.) Carolin ex Hershk.
C. calycina Carolin ex Hershk.
C.celosioides (Phil.) Carolin ex Hershk.
C.cephalophora (I.M.Johnston) Carolin ex Hershk.
C.coquimbensis (Barneoud) Carolin ex Hershk.
C.cymosa (Phil.) Hershk.
C. densiflora (Barnéoud) Hershk.
C. monandra (Nutt.) Hershk.

Works
 Hershkovitz, M.A. & Zimmer, E.A. 2000. Ribosomal DNA evidence and disjunctions of western American Portulacaceae  Mol. Phylogenetics and Evolution 15(3): 419–439.
 Hershkovitz M.A., Arroyo M.T.K, Bell C., and Hinojosa L.F 2006
Phylogeny of Chaetanthera (Asteraceae: Mutisieae) reveals both ancient and recent origins of the high elevation lineages Molecular Phylogenetics and Evolution 41: 594-605.

References

Living people
American botanists
Year of birth missing (living people)
Illinois State University alumni
University of California, Davis alumni
Smithsonian Institution people
American taxonomists
National Institutes of Health people
Academic staff of the University of Chile
20th-century American biochemists
21st-century American biochemists
American expatriates in Chile
American expatriate academics